Dover is a town and seaport in Kent, England. The following is a list of those people who were born and/or have lived extensively in Dover.

Frederick Arnold (1899–1980), cricketer and British Army officer
James Barber (1923–2007), cookbook author and host of CBC's The Urban Peasant
Tammy Beaumont (born 1991), England cricketer
Charlotte Bellamy (born 1973), TV actress
Edward Betts (1815–1872), civil engineer and contractor
Bob Bolder: Footballer.
Alan Clayson (born 1951), musician
Colin Greenland (born 1954), novelist
David Elleray (born 1954), FA football referee
Wally Hammond (1903–1965), cricketer
Topper Headon (born 1955), drummer
Rob Henderson (born 1972), rugby union player
White Kennett (1660–1728), Anglican Bishop of Peterborough and antiquarian
Jim Leverton (born 1946), rock musician
John Lloyd (born 1951), comedy writer and TV producer
Rhys Lloyd (born 1982), American football player
E. J. Lowe (1950–2014), philosopher and academic
Miriam Margolyes (born 1941), actress (Professor Sprout in Harry Potter and The Spanish Infanta in Blackadder) 
Sammy Moore (born 1987), football player
Howard Mowll (1890–1958), Anglican Archbishop of Sydney and Primate of Australia
Andrea Newman (1938–2019), author and television screenwriter
Cuthbert Ottaway (1850–1879), first captain of the England football team
Edward Pellew, 1st Viscount Exmouth (1757–1833), naval commander
Frank Rutley (1842–1904), geologist
Patrick Saul (1913–1999), sound archivist
Henry Hawley Smart (1833–1893), army officer and prolific novelist
Joss Stone (born 1987), soul and R and B singer/songwriter, and occasional actress
Neil Stuke (born 1966), actor
John Russell Taylor (born 1935), critic and author
Carl Thompson (1981/2–2015), heaviest man in the United Kingdom
Philip Yorke, 1st Earl of Hardwicke (1690–1764), politician and Lord Chancellor
Shane Taylor (born 1974), actor

References

Dover
Dover, Kent